The College of Liberal Arts (COLA) is the liberal arts college at The University of Texas at Austin. The college dates back to 1883, the university's opening year, but today's college was formed in 1970 with the split of the College of Arts & Sciences. The college offers more than 45 degrees in undergraduate and graduate liberal arts disciplines.

Academics 
COLA offers the largest number of majors of any UT college. It includes the departments of:

 Africa and African Diaspora Studies
 Air Force Science
 American Studies
 Anthropology
 Asian Studies
 Classics
 Economics
 English
 French and Italian
 Geography and the Environment
 Germanic Studies
 Government 
 History
 Linguistics
 Mexican American and Latina/o Studies
 Middle Eastern Studies
 Military Science
 Naval Science
 Philosophy
 Psychology
 Religious Studies
 Rhetoric and Writing
 Slavic and Eurasian Studies
 Sociology
 Spanish & Portuguese
The school is also home to a number of centers and institutes related to the liberal arts.

Honors Programs 
The college offers several honors programs for students. Many departments grant honors based on their own criteria. Upperclassmen can apply to the Liberal Arts Honors program. Established in 1935, Plan II Honors is an interdisciplinary major with a focus on problem solving, critical and analytical skills, and writing. Admission to the Plan II honors program is selective and requires an additional application.

Facilities 
The college's first departments were located in the old Main Building which was demolished in 1934 for new construction.

In 1904, the Gebauer Building was built directly east of the UT Tower. In 1984, it was named after Dorothy L. Gebauer, the former Dean of Women. It is the oldest building still standing on the original 40 acres. Today, it houses the administrative offices for the college.

In 2013, the Patton Hall Building opened. It houses 11 liberal arts departments, centers, and programs.

References

External links
 

Liberal Arts
Liberal arts colleges in Texas
Educational institutions established in 1883
1883 establishments in Texas